Pouteria sessilis is a species of plant in the family Sapotaceae. It is endemic to Peru.

References

sessilis
Vulnerable plants
Trees of Peru
Taxonomy articles created by Polbot